Hyangnosan is a mountain located in Miryang, Gyeongnam Province, South Korea.

See also
Geography of South Korea
List of mountains in Korea
List of mountains by elevation
Mountain portal
South Korea portal

References

Mountains of South Gyeongsang Province
Miryang
Mountains of South Korea